Morera Thatte is an archaeological site consisting of a number of stone structures on Chikkabenkal hill near Gangavathi in Koppal district, India, dating back to the Stone Age. These houses are said to have been constructed 3,000 years ago. These houses have been built from stone slabs, with a circular opening serving as a door.

The area is currently uninhabited, and among the stone houses are strewn several other small objects made of stone.  The structures, though built in an era of limited technology, are shaped into neat semicircular slabs stacked atop each other. It is said that the place had over 600 such houses at one point, and villagers say that there were 200 to 250 of them a few years ago. But today there are hardly 40 to 50 of them left.

Etymology
Because the roofs of these houses are shaped like plates, the local people call it Morera Thatte though the origin and meaning of the term morera is unknown.

Origin
Stone age men who might have lived in Agoli, Gaddi, Chikkabenkal villages must have built these structures to protect themselves from wildlife. Others say they are graves. But, according to Sharanabasappa Kolkar, a history lecturer from a local college, these structures definitely belong to the Stone Age.

Preservation
Today, these Stone Age structures are in danger of being plundered  by treasure hunters and local cowherds. The Stone Age man had no knowledge about metals. Treasure hunters, who are unaware of this, have tried to bring down these stone structures, and look for bounty. But, there is still hope, for the Hyderabad-Karnataka Development Board Secretary Shalini Goel and the Gulbarga region's Commissioner Rajneesh Goe] have shown interest in these structures, and are chalking out a plan to save them.

See also
Hirebenkal 
Sidlaphadi 
Sanganakallu 
Khyad 
Kupgal petroglyphs
 Archaeology in India
 Timeline of Indian history
 List of Indus Valley Civilisation sites
 List of archaeological sites by country#India
 List of archaeological sites by continent and age
 World Heritage Sites by country#India

References

Archaeological sites in Karnataka
Burial monuments and structures
Megalithic monuments in India
Neolithic settlements
Buildings and structures in Koppal district